Miracle in Cell No. 7 is a 2019 Filipino drama film directed by Nuel Crisostomo Naval and starring Aga Muhlach and Bela Padilla. The film is based on the 2013 South Korean film of the same name directed by Lee Hwan-kyung.

The film revolves around Lito (Aga Muhlach), a mentally challenged man who was wrongfully accused of killing the daughter of Secretary Yulo (Tirso Cruz III) as well as his attempt to maintain relations with his own daughter Yesha (Xia Vigor) through the help of his fellow inmates.

Distributed and produced by Viva Films, the film premiered on December 25, 2019 as one of the eight official entries to the 2019 Metro Manila Film Festival.

Plot
Joselito “Lito” Gopez is a mentally impaired man with the intellect of a six-year-old. He lives in a run-down house  in Marikina River along with his daughter Yesha. One day, he gets into a physical altercation with the Defense Secretary Yulo, who has just purchased the last Sailor Moon backpack for his daughter Jenny, a gift Lito was saving up to buy for Yesha. Soon after, Jenny dies in a freak accident, in which she slips because of the wet pavement and suffers a fatal blow in the head while taking Lito to a store that sells the same backpack. When Lito tries to resuscitate her, a bystander mistakenly thinks he is molesting her. Lito is falsely accused of the kidnapping, murder and rape of a minor. Police quickly take advantage of his disability and force him to confess to the crimes while ignoring exonerating evidence. Lito is imprisoned and assigned to Cell No. 7, the harshest cell in a maximum security prison.

The other men in the cell led by gang leader Soliman “Boss Sol” with Mambo, Choy, Bong, and Tatang Celso initially don't take kindly to Lito after reading in his file that he murdered and molested a child. When Lito saves Boss Sol from being fatally stabbed by a rival gang leader, Boss Sol repays the favor by smuggling Yesha into Cell No. 7. The cell's inmates slowly befriend Lito and believe he is a good man who just happened to be in the wrong place at the wrong time. They help him rehearse what to say at his trial. Eventually, even the warden Johnny, who is initially harsh to Lito but softens up when the latter saves him from an arson attack, realizes that Lito was merely cornered into making a false confession. He takes custody of Yesha and allows her to visit her father every now and then.

Secretary Yulo, however, threatens to harm Yesha if Lito doesn't confess his "crime" during his trial. Lito ultimately chooses to sacrifice himself by pleading guilty and getting the death sentence. His execution date of December 23 coincides with Yesha's birthday. Before the date, Boss Sol and fellow inmates work on a hot air balloon and force Lito and Yesha to board to try and let them escape, but ultimately failed because of a rope connected to the hot air balloon caught in a barbed wire, later on in the film Lito was executed.

Years after Lito's execution, Yesha, who has been formally adopted by Johnny, has become a lawyer. She gathers her father's former inmates, all of whom have been released, to testify at her late father's retrial, which results in his acquittal. She then imagines her father dancing with their signature dance.

Cast

Main cast
Aga Muhlach as Joselito “Lito” Gopez†
Bela Padilla as Atty. Yesha Gopez
Xia Vigor as young Yesha

Supporting cast
Joel Torre as Soliman / Boss Sol
JC Santos as Mambo
Mon Confiado as Choy
Jojit Lorenzo as Bong
Soliman Cruz as Tatang Celso
John Arcilla as Prison Director Johnny San Juan
Tirso Cruz III as Secretary Yulo
Ronnie Lazaro as police
Yayo Aguila as Cathy San Juan
Epy Quizon as prosecutor
Mark Anthony Fernandez as Pancho
Candy Pangilinan as orphanage rectress
Ian de Leon as lawyer
Christopher Roxas
Jong Cuenco as Judge Ricardo Giron
Mayton Eugenio as Teacher Marilou
Jonic Magno as Doctor

Production
Miracle in Cell No. 7 was directed by Nuel Naval and written by Mel del Rosario under Viva Films. The film is an adaptation of the 2013 South Korean film of the same name. The original film was directed by Lee Hwan-kyung.

The film being a Philippine adaptation of a South Korean film is set in the Philippines. The protagonists' residence is situated somewhere along the Marikina River. Several other aspects of the film were changed from the source material including the names of the characters. The prison which served as the main setting of the Philippine adaptation was filmed in a sound stage in Cainta, Rizal.

Aga Muhlach's character is the counterpart of Yong-gu of the original Korean film while Bela Padilla's character was the counterpart of Yong-gu's daughter Ye-seung. Among the challenge of posed by the adaptation process is how a faithful depiction of Philippine prisons would affect the film's plot. In the original South Korean film, the prisons were closed confinements with metal doors while in the Philippines prisons are less restrictive with metal railings instead which would pose problem on how the lead character's fellow inmates would hide his daughter from the jail wardens. The Philippine film also had less focus on the trial portion compared to its South Korean counterpart.

Nadine Lustre was supposed to play Padilla's role but withdrew from the film project citing a need to take a break after her stints with two 2019 films, Ulan and Indak.

Marketing
A teaser was released in November 2019 for Miracle in Cell No. 7 which had at least 7 million online views in 24 hours. The full trailer for the film was released in December 2019. Lead actor, Aga Muhlach also guested in Headstart to promote the film.

Release
Miracle in Cell No. 7 premiered in cinemas across the Philippines on December 25, 2019 as one of the official entries to the 2019 Metro Manila Film Festival. The film was distributed by Viva Films.

Reception
Viva Films, the distributor and producer of Miracle in Cell No. 7 claims that tickets to its film was sold out in most cinemas in Metro Manila on the opening day of the 2019 Metro Manila Film Festival.

References

External links
 

Philippine drama films
2010s prison drama films
Films shot in Rizal
Films about miscarriage of justice
Films about mental health
Films about father–daughter relationships
2019 drama films
2019 films
Remakes of South Korean films
Philippine remakes of South Korean films
Films directed by Nuel Crisostomo Naval